The OC Post was a daily newspaper for Orange County, California, that existed from August 21, 2006, to February 2008. Chartered by Freedom Communications, who also own and operate the Orange County Register, it was an attempt to condense a standard newspaper into a more "modern" tabloid format.

Unlike other new tabloid style newspapers throughout the US, the OC Post charged for its publication whether for home delivery or newsstand. The newsstand price was 25 cents, with yearly subscriptions available for $19.99.  The publisher occasionally gave out free 5-week "sample subscriptions" in selected neighborhoods, in order to build awareness of the newspaper.

OC Post was charged with littering Orange County gated communities with unwanted copies of its paper scattered about in white plastic bags.  It was reported that houses had many copies of the unwanted items, collected over several days, strewn about their yards and driveways, in spite of repeated requests to cease delivery.  The publisher claimed that the number of paid subscriptions steadily increased since the product was launched.

Production of the OC Post ended on February 9, 2008. It merged with the Irvine Daily News and is distributed exclusively in Irvine, California.

References

External links
OC Post.com

Daily newspapers published in Greater Los Angeles
Mass media in Orange County, California
Publications established in 2006
Publications disestablished in 2008
Defunct newspapers published in California
Freedom Communications